Official Competition is a 2021 Spanish-Argentine black comedy-drama film directed by Gastón Duprat and Mariano Cohn, from a screenplay by Duprat, Cohn and Andrés Duprat. It stars Penélope Cruz, Antonio Banderas and Oscar Martínez.

Plot
On his 80th birthday, Humberto Suárez, an ageing multi-millionaire, decides to finance a film so that people will look fondly upon his legacy. He selects the reclusive Palme d'Or laureate Lola Cuevas to be the director, with the screenplay being adapted from a Nobel Prize-winning novel titled Rivalry about a man who is unable to forgive his brother for killing their parents in a drunk-driving accident. The two brothers are to be played by acclaimed stage actor Iván Torres and celebrity actor Félix Rivero; Iván is a method actor who has extensively prepared his character's past, while Félix is a more common Hollywood actor who finds Iván's methods pointless.

Lola proves herself to be a highly eccentric director who makes extensive notes and requires increasingly bizarre exercises of her actors, such as forcing them to repeat single lines or words until she believes they are convincing enough, refusing to show up to rehearsals, and at one point dangling a large boulder over the heads of Iván and Félix via a crane to emulate the tension of the scene they are rehearsing. One session involves Iván and Félix being tied to chairs and forced to watch as Lola crushes their various awards in an industrial shredder, including a handmade one that was given to Iván by students at a disabled school where he once taught.

One day during rehearsals, Félix tells Lola and Iván that he has been diagnosed with pancreatic cancer and is on palliative care, hoping that Rivalry will be his final masterpiece. Iván privately suggests to Lola that he could double up in order to play both brothers if Félix ends up unable to complete the project. Felix later confesses to them both that his diagnosis was a lie that he used in order to prove to the pair that he could fool them with his acting. Iván commends his performance and tells him that he believes Félix to be a better actor than he is, before revealing that this too was a lie as payback.

Eventually, they reach the final scene of the film, where Félix's character murders Iván's and takes over his brother's life. At a party held by Humberto to commemorate the film starting shooting, Félix overhears Iván describe him as the worst actor he has ever worked with. Félix confronts him on the roof of the building, where Iván attempts to punch Félix who accidentally throws him from the roof, rendering him comatose. Assuming that he must have jumped, Iván's wife is comforted by Félix; however, Lola seems to recognize that Félix is merely acting surprised at the incident.

The film proceeds to shooting, with both roles played by Félix. At a post-screening Q&A, Lola bluntly denies any perceived meaning that the critics read into her film and gives one-word answers. In the final scenes narrated by Lola who directly addresses the audience, Humberto decides to finance a bridge, Félix returns to Hollywood projects and Iván wakes from his coma and curses Félix's name.

Cast

Production
In January 2020 casting was announced featuring Antonio Banderas, Penélope Cruz, Oscar Martínez, Pilar Castro, Irene Escolar, Carlos Hipólito, José Luis Gómez, Nagore Aranburu, Koldo Olabarri and Juan Grandinetti with Gastón Duprat & Mariano Cohn directing from a screenplay penned alongside . Cruz and Banderas had only shared onscreen time before during two minutes of Pedro Almodóvar's 2013 film I'm So Excited!.

The film was produced by The Mediapro Studio, with the participation of RTVE, TV3, and Orange España.

Principal photography began in February 2020. In March 2020, production was halted due to the COVID-19 pandemic. Shooting resumed in September 2020 and the wrap was announced in October 2020. Filming took place in the Spanish cities of Madrid, San Lorenzo de El Escorial and Ávila.

Release 
Official Competition had its world premiere at the 78th Venice International Film Festival on 4 September 2021. It also screened at the Toronto International Film Festival in mid-September 2021. Buena Vista International released the film on 25 February 2022 in Spain. Protagonist Pictures handled the international distribution rights.

Star Distribution acquired distribution rights for Latin America. In the case of Argentina, the film was released on 17 March 2022. IFC Films purchased the theatrical release rights for the United States.

Reception
On the review aggregator Rotten Tomatoes, 96% of 151 reviews are positive, with an average rating of 7.6/10. The website's critics consensus reads, "Its premise may resonate most with hardcore film fans, but Official Competitions tight focus and sharp humor have a universal appeal."

At the 2021 Cinéfest Sudbury International Film Festival, it won the award for Outstanding International Feature. At the 2021 Vancouver International Film Festival, it won the Audience Award for most popular film in the Galas and Special Presentations program.

Accolades

|-
| align = "center" | 2022 || 30th Actors and Actresses Union Awards || Best Actress in an International Production || Penélope Cruz ||  || 
|-
| rowspan = "2" align = "center" | 2023 || rowspan = "1" | 10th Feroz Awards || colspan = "2" | Best Comedy Film ||  || rowspan = "1" | 
|-
| 37th Goya Awards || Best Cinematography || Arnau Valls Colomer ||  || 
|}

See also
 List of Spanish films of 2022

References

External links
 Official Competition at ICAA's Catálogo de Cinespañol
 
 
 

2021 films
2021 black comedy films
2021 comedy-drama films
Spanish black comedy films
Spanish comedy-drama films
Argentine black comedy films
Argentine comedy-drama films
2020s Spanish films
2020s Argentine films
2020s Spanish-language films
Film productions suspended due to the COVID-19 pandemic
Films about actors
Films about film directors and producers
Films directed by Gastón Duprat and Mariano Cohn
Buena Vista International films
Films shot in Madrid
Films shot in the province of Ávila